The wave offering (Hebrew: tenufah תנופה) or sheaf offering or omer offering (korban omer) was an offering (korban) made by the Jewish priests to God (Exodus 29:24, 26, 27; Leviticus 7:20-34; 8:27; 9:21; 10:14, 15, etc.). The sheaf or omer or wave-offering then became the property of the priests.

Hebrew Bible

The omer offering (Hebrew korban omer, minchat omer) was a grain sacrifice wave offering, brought to the temple in Jerusalem. The first-fruits was a sheaf of barley which was offered in connection with the Feast of Unleavened Bread, directly following the Passover. The first-fruits of the second harvest, the loaves of bread, are offered at Shavuot, and both were wave offerings. The leftover of the korban are kept by the kohen and was listed as one of the twenty-four priestly gifts.

The Levitical priests themselves were also offered to God by Aaron as a wave offering.

The omer offering was discontinued following the destruction of the Second Temple.

Etymology 
Omer is often rendered "sheaf" in English translations. The noun tenufah is formed from the verb nuf in the same way as terumah, the heave offering, is formed from rum "heave." Both types of offering occur together in Exodus 29:27  and in Leviticus 7:30-34: from the sacrificed ram, the breast with its fat constituted a wave offering and the right thigh constituted a heave offering, both being given to the priests as kohanic gifts.

In the Septuagint it was translated aphorisma (ἀφόρισμα).

Counting of the Omer
Beginning on the second night of Passover, the 16th day of Nisan, Jews begin the practice of the Counting of the Omer, a nightly reminder of the approach of the holiday of Shavuot 50 days hence. Each night after the evening prayer service, men and women recite a special blessing and then enumerate the day of the Omer. On the first night, for example, they say, "Today is the first day in (or, to) the Omer"; on the second night, "Today is the second day in the Omer." The counting also involves weeks; thus, the seventh day is commemorated, "Today is the seventh day, which is one week in the Omer." The eighth day is marked, "Today is the eighth day, which is one week and one day in the Omer," etc.

When the Temple stood in Jerusalem, a sheaf of new-cut barley was presented before the altar on the second day of Unleavened Bread. Josephus writesOn the second day of unleavened bread, that is to say the sixteenth, our people partake of the crops which they have reaped and which have not been touched till then, and esteeming it right first to do homage to God, to whom they owe the abundance of these gifts, they offer to him the first-fruits of the barley in the following way. After parching and crushing the little sheaf of ears and purifying the barley for grinding, they bring to the altar an assaron for God, and, having flung a handful thereof on the altar, they leave the rest for the use of the priests. Thereafter all are permitted, publicly or individually, to begin harvest. Since the destruction of the Temple, this offering is brought in word rather than deed.

One explanation for the Counting of the Omer is that it shows the connection between Passover and Shavuot. The physical freedom that the Hebrews achieved at the Exodus from Egypt was only the beginning of a process that climaxed with the spiritual freedom they gained at the giving of the Torah at Mount Sinai. Another explanation is that the newborn nation which emerged after the Exodus needed time to learn their new responsibilities vis-a-vis Torah and mitzvot before accepting God's law. The distinction between the Omer offering—a measure of barley, typically animal fodder—and the Shavuot offering—two loaves of wheat bread, human food—symbolizes the transition process.

See also 
 Korbanot, the sacrifice offerings in the Jewish temple in Jerusalem.

References 

 

Jewish sacrificial law